Tavşanlı is a belde (town) in Altınova district of Yalova Province, Turkey. At  it is  situated in the northern portion of Armutlu Peninsula. The population of Tavşanlı is 2586 as of 2010. The ferry dock is only  to Tavşanlı  and the picnik places around the town can easily by reached in daily tours from İstanbul. Fruit and vegetable farming as well as floriculture are the main sources of revenue of the town.

References

Populated places in Yalova Province
Towns in Turkey
Populated places in Altınova District